Gregory Allen Brower (born February 8, 1964) is an American attorney in private practice, former state senator in the Nevada Senate, former United States Attorney in the state of Nevada and a former member of the Nevada Assembly. He is a member of the Republican Party. Currently, Brower sits on the bipartisan advisory board of States United Democracy Center.

Early life, education and early career
Brower was born on February 8, 1964, in South Milwaukee, Wisconsin, and moved to Nevada at a young age. He graduated from Bonanza High School in Las Vegas in 1982, and he attended the University of California, Berkeley—where he received his bachelor's degree in political economy in 1986. Brower later received a J.D. degree from George Washington University in 1992.

Following college, Brower served as a surface warfare officer on a warship in the Pacific Fleet and in the Pentagon in the United States Navy during active and reserve duty from 1987-1993. He was a commissioned officer with the rank of Lieutenant.

United States Attorney for the District of Nevada
Brower served as the United States Attorney for the District of Nevada, Nevada's chief federal prosecutor, from 2008-2009.

He was nominated to the U.S. Attorney post by President George W. Bush on November 15, 2007, and confirmed by the U.S. Senate on December 13, 2007.

Immediately prior to his nomination, Brower worked as a lawyer in the Bush Administration from 2003-2007. He first worked in the U.S. Justice Department, and then served as Inspector General and general counsel for the Government Printing Office.

As U.S. Attorney, Brower oversaw a team of nearly 50 federal prosecutors in Nevada. During his tenure, he oversaw the prosecution of 1,100 people charged with violating federal criminal laws and secured a 90% conviction rate. Brower also oversaw 700 civil cases as U.S. Attorney, and he won 90% of the cases.

He left office on October 10, 2009, following the nomination and confirmation of Daniel Bogden to replace him by President Barack Obama.

In 2017, Brower was cited for misconduct from his time as a federal prosecutor in Nevada by the U.S. Equal Employment Opportunity Commission. The decision found that a former female prosecutor was a victim of sex discrimination during the time Brower headed the U.S. attorney's office.

Nevada Legislature
In 1998, Brower was elected to the Nevada Assembly and served two terms. Brower represented Nevada Senate District 15, previously called Washoe County District 3, in the Nevada Senate, a position he was appointed to by the Washoe County Commission following the resignation of Sen. Bill Raggio in January 2011.

77th Regular Session - 2011
 Senate Committee on Judiciary
 Senate Committee on Revenue and Economic Development

Opposition to President Donald Trump
In 2020, Brower, along with over 130 other former Republican national security officials, signed a statement that asserted that President Trump was unfit to serve another term, and "To that end, we are firmly convinced that it is in the best interest of our nation that Vice President Joe Biden be elected as the next President of the United States, and we will vote for him."

In October 2020, Brower signed a letter, along with 19 other Republican-appointed former U.S. Attorneys, calling President Donald Trump "a threat to the rule of law in our country" and endorsing Joe Biden.

Brower, along with more than 100 Republican former national security officials, signed a letter in November that stated that the delay of the presidential transition imperiled the security of the nation. The 9/11 Commission finding that the shortened transition to the administration of George W. Bush during the disputed 2000 presidential election "hampered the new administration in identifying, recruiting, clearing, and obtaining Senate confirmation of key appointees” was mentioned in the statement.

Electoral history

† Washoe County Commissioner Bonnie Weber recused herself from voting because her husband was a candidate for the appointment

References

1964 births
George Washington University Law School alumni
Living people
Republican Party members of the Nevada Assembly
Nevada lawyers
Republican Party Nevada state senators
People from South Milwaukee, Wisconsin
People from the Las Vegas Valley
Politicians from Reno, Nevada
United States Attorneys for the District of Nevada
United States Navy officers
UC Berkeley College of Letters and Science alumni